is a shōjo manga series created by Yayoi Ogawa.  It is licensed in French by Kurokawa.

Plot
Nagisa has lived with her mother ever since her parents divorced in her childhood. One day her mother is killed in an accident, so now she has to live with her stepfather, Ryunosuke. But he is so nuts that she is always irritated by him

Characters
 Nagisa
A first year in high school who is very intelligent. She doesn't like Ryu at first, but grows to like him. She doesn't like his perverted ways, and often hits him when he tries to do something. She likes Hanniya, and experiences her first kiss with him.
 Ryunosuke
He is a young photographer that married Nagisa's mother. His wife died on their honeymoon while getting a postcard from their hotel room in France. Although he may seem perverted and uncaring, deep inside he cares about Nagisa very much and only wishes her the best. It is said that he has thin irises which is his reason for wearing sunglasses all the time. He takes them off when he really cares about someone or when he is in a dire situation.

Volumes
  released in February 1999
  released in September 1999

References

External links
 

Shōjo manga
1999 manga